Dedrick Brandes Stuber (May 3, 1878 - August 18, 1954) was an American painter. He was born in New York City, and he became a painter in California in 1920. One of his paintings is at the Smithsonian American Art Museum in Washington, D.C.

References

1878 births
1954 deaths
Painters from New York City
Painters from California
American male painters
20th-century American painters
20th-century American male artists